The Millionaire's Club was a professional wrestling stable in World Championship Wrestling (WCW) in 2000.

Millionaire's Club may also refer to:

The United States Senate or more broadly the United States Congress
Millionaire's Club International, Inc., a matchmaking company founded by Patti Stanger

See also
Atlanta Millionaires Club, a 2019 album by Faye Webster
Monopoly Millionaires' Club, a U.S. multistate lottery drawing game
Secret Millionaires Club, an American educational animated series